El Dorado Elementary School, now known as Stockton School for Adults, is a public school building in Stockton, California. Built in 1916, the building was added to the National Register of Historic Places in 1977. It was designated a Stockton Historic Landmark by resolution number 34,306 on July 11, 1977.

History 

El Dorado Elementary School is a two-story, brick, U-shaped structure. It was enlarged in 1922, by adding four classrooms to each wing. At a later, unknown date, the open court between the two wings was roofed over to provide a covered play area.

The state commission considered demolishing the El Dorado Elementary School building in 1976 due to concerns about earthquake safety, but chose to retain it.

References

External links

Stockton School for Adults, official website

		
National Register of Historic Places in San Joaquin County, California
Tudor Revival architecture in the United States
School buildings completed in 1916
1916 establishments in California